The Minnesota Lakers Lacrosse Club was formed in 1976, originally known as Twin Cities Lacrosse Club. A member of the Midwest Cities Lacrosse Conference (MCLC), the Lakers are one of 13 clubs who compete in the Senior/post-collegiate lacrosse league. Minnesota Lakers compete in the Western Division of MCLC with: Chicago Lacrosse Club, Chitown Lacrosse Club, Lincoln Park Lacrosse Club, Minneapolis Lacrosse Club, Minnesota Premium Lacrosse Club and Sr. Gophers Lacrosse Club.

The Lakers home field is Benilde-St. Margaret's Stadium in St. Louis Park.

History 

2011: Just 3-3 during the regular season, Minnesota would defeat Motor City LC in the tourney quarterfinal only to fall 14-9 against Columbus LC. In the third-place game Minnesota were victorious against Windy City LC. Columbus LC ended up vacating the title a month after defeating Lincoln Park 8-3 in the final. A new championship game between the Lakers and Lincoln Park could not be arranged so no MCLC champion was crowned.

2012: Minnesota Lakers were the fourth-seed for the post-season tournament held in Barrington, Illinois after finishing 4-2. With victories over fifth-seeded Cincinnati LC and top-seed Lincoln Park LC, Minnesota advanced to the MCLC championship game. An 8-6 win over Chicago LC earned the Lakers their second league championship in club history.

2013: A perfect 6-0 record during the 2013 season, the Lakers were the top-seed in the two-day MCLC Playoff Tournament. On opening day the Lakers took an easy 13-8 victory over Chitown LC in the quarterfinals. The semifinals had the Lakers against their division-rival Minneapolis LC, who they defeated 9-8 on a goal with just :02 remaining. Minnesota came up just short of their second-straight league title, losing 5-4 in overtime to Cleveland LC.

Season-by-season

Notes

External links 
 Minnesota Lakers LC team website
 @MNLakersLax

Lacrosse teams in Minnesota
1976 establishments in Minnesota
Lacrosse clubs established in 1976
Sports in Minneapolis